The Yrjö Jahnsson Foundation is a charitable foundation whose aims are to promote Finnish research in economics and medicine and to maintain and support educational and research facilities in Finland. It was established in 1954 by the wife of Yrjö Jahnsson, Hilma Jahnsson. It supports the award of the Yrjö Jahnsson Award and Yrjö Jahnsson Lecture series. These lectures have been delivered by noteworthy economists since 1963. 10 of the Yrjö Jahnsson Lecture series scholars have gone on to win the Nobel prize in economics, making it a top predictor for future recipients.

The Yrjö Jahnsson Lecture series 
Source: Yrjö Jahnsson Foundation
 1963	Kenneth J. Arrow Aspects of the Theory of Risk-Bearing
 1967	Assar Lindbeck Monetary-Fiscal Analysis and General Equilibrium
 1968	L.R. Klein An Essay on the Theory of Economic Prediction
 1970	Harry G. Johnson The Two-Sector Model of General Equilibrium
 1973	John Hicks The Crisis in Keynesian Economics
 1976	Edmond Malinvaud The Theory of Unemployment Reconsidered
 1978	James Tobin Asset Accumulation and Economic Activity
 1980	János Kornai Growth, Shortage and Efficiency
 1983	Jacques H. Drèze Labour Management, Contracts and Capital Markets
 1985	Robert E. Lucas Models of Business Cycles
 1987	Amartya Sen Rational Behaviour
 1990	A.B. Atkinson Poverty in Europe
 1992	Bengt Holmström Models of the Firm
 1996	Paul R. Krugman Economic Theory and the East Asia Miracle
 1999	Hans-Werner Sinn The New Systems Competition
 2002 Alvin Roth The Timing of Transactions: Strategic behavior, and market performance
 2005 Ricardo Caballero Macroeconomics and Restructuring in the Global Economy
 2007 Peter Diamond Thinking about Taxes
 2010 Tim Besley, Torsten Persson Pillars of Prosperity: The political economics of state building
 2012 John A. List Using Field Experiments in Economics
 2015 Nicholas Bloom, John van Reenen Management and the Wealth of Nations
 2019 Daron Acemoglu, The Future of Work

Yrjö Jahnsson Award
The Yrjö Jahnsson Award is a biennial award given by the Finnish Yrjö Jahnsson Foundation to European economists under the age of 45 "who have made a contribution in theoretical and applied research that is significant to the study of economics in Europe." The selection committee, chaired by the president of the EEA, consists of five members, four nominated by the European Economic Association (EEA) and one by the Yrjö Jahnsson Foundation. The selection committee consults all EEA fellows individually and uses their responses together with their own judgment to form a short list.

Recipients
Source: Yrjö Jahnsson Foundation

See also

 List of economics awards
John Bates Clark Medal
Gossen Prize

References

External links
Yrjö Jahnsson Foundation
 European Economic Association Awards

Foundations based in Finland
1954 establishments in Finland